van Grunsven or VanGrunsven is a surname. Notable people with the surname include:

Anky van Grunsven (born 1968), Dutch dressage rider
Marcel van Grunsven (1896–1969), Dutch mayor
Richard VanGrunsven (born 1939), American aircraft designer

Surnames of Dutch origin